Cortes, Cortés, Cortês, Corts, or Cortès may refer to:

People

 Cortes (surname), including a list of people with the name
 Hernán Cortés (1485–1547), a Spanish conquistador

Places
 Cortes, Navarre, a village in the South border of Navarre, Spain
 Cortes de Aragón, Teruel, a municipality in the province of Teruel, Aragón, Spain
 Cortes, Bohol, a municipality in the Philippines
 Cortes, Surigao del Sur, a municipality in the Philippines
 Cortês, a municipality in Pernambuco, Brazil
 Puerto Cortés, a seaport in Honduras 
 Cortés Department, a department in Honduras
 Cortes Island, an island in British Columbia, Canada
 Cortes, Aberdeenshire, a village in Scotland, United Kingdom

Institutions
 Cortes of Cádiz, former parliament of Spain
 Cortes Generales, the parliament of Spain
 Aragonese Corts, the regional parliament for the Spanish autonomous community of Aragon
 Cortes of Castile-La Mancha, the legislature of the Autonomous Community of Castile–La Mancha, Spain
 Cortes of Castile and León, the legislature of the Autonomous Community of Castile and León, Spain
 Cortes of León, a parliamentary body in the medieval Kingdom of León
 Catalan Courts, historical parliamentary body of the Principality of Catalonia
 Corts Valencianes, the legislature of the Valencian Community
 Portuguese Cortes, any of historical consultative assemblies called by kings of Portugal
 Cortes Gerais, the legislature of the Kingdom of Portugal during the 19th and 20th centuries

Other
 Cortes (miniseries), an American television miniseries

See also
 Corte (disambiguation)
 Cortez (disambiguation)
 Les Corts (disambiguation)